"Life Is Better with You" is the fourth single by Eskimo Joe, taken from their second studio album A Song Is a City. It was released in December 2004.

Temperley talks about the song coming from “sitting around with my friends taking stock of what had happened the night before, and then it was kind of an appreciation of my friends, because for four or five years I’d been on the road, I worked really, really hard every time I came home to keep those connections with my good friends in Fremantle and I think anyone who works in a band will tell you they draw a lot of strength from that, coming back and having your mates and being able to reconnect in that really normal way.”

The single was originally intended to be the second single.

Clayton Bolger of Allmusic describes it as being one of the album’s highlights with an uplifting chorus complete with makeshift choir although he feels that the verses owe much to Neil Young's "Down by the River".

Two versions of the music video were released and both were included on the band's 2005 video album, Eskimo Joe. The videos were directed by Anton Monsted, who had worked extensively with Australian film director Baz Luhrmann, and Jason Lamont of Black Milk productions.

The song was included on the soundtrack to the critically acclaimed Australian television drama series Love My Way.

Track listing

Release history

References

Eskimo Joe songs
2004 singles
2004 songs
Warner Music Australasia singles
Mushroom Records singles
Songs written by Stuart MacLeod (musician)
Songs written by Joel Quartermain
Songs written by Kavyen Temperley